Timi Salonen (born 2 August 2001) is a speedway rider from Finland.

Speedway career 
Salonen represented Finland at senior level in the 2022 Speedway of Nations final, after securing a second place finish in the semi final. Also in 2022, he finished 12th in the final standings of the 2022 SGP2.

In 2022, he was riding for Slangerup in Denmark and Rzeszów in Poland. 

In 2023, Salonen was a qualified substitute for the World Championship for the 2023 Speedway Grand Prix.

References 

Living people
2001 births
Finnish speedway riders